Bwari is a local government area in the Federal Capital Territory in Nigeria. The original inhabitants of the town are the Gbagyi speaking people. The paramount ruler is the Esu who is otherwise known as Sa-bwaya. However, with the establishment of FCT in Abuja so many changes occurred; such changes include the turbaning of late Musa Ijakoro (of Koro ethnic minority, and from Suleja Emirate where parts of Abuja’s land was carved out) as District Head of Bwari in 1976, and his elevation as Sarki of Bwari to the position of a second class status in 1997 by the Ministry of the Federal Capital Territory under the then minister, General Jeremiah Useni.

Following the complaints and confrontation by the Gbagyis over the elevation of the Sarki’s stool to a second class status, the FCT administration then elevated the Esu’s stool to a third class position with the aim of calming the tension; but this would not pacify the Gbagyis as they claim to be the majority and original inhabitants of the town. The Gbagyis have also claimed that there was an understanding that after the death of Ijakoro, the "Sarki of Bwari" position would cease to exist; but this was never the case, as his son, Muhammad Auwal Ijakoro took over as the new Sarki of Bwari after his demise.

On Christmas Day of 2017, there was communal clash between the Hausa [who majorly support the Sarki on religious grounds] and Gbagyi communities that engulfed the Bwari district of Abuja over same Chieftaincy dispute, in which two people were confirmed dead with properties including the Bwari Main Market burnt.

Bwari plays host to important institutions and public establishments such as:

 Bwari Area Council Secretariat.
Bwari General Hospital.
 Nigerian Law School, Bwari.
 Joint Admission & Matriculation Board (JAMB) HQ's.
 JAMB UTME Computer-Based Testing Centre, Kogo.
 Dorben Polytechnic, Abuja(now operating from its permanent site in Garam, Niger State).
 Veritas [Catholic] University.

Politically, Bwari Area Council has at the helm of affairs an elected chairman with ten elected councilors representing the ten wards.

According to NIPOST's website, Bwari Area Council has the following towns/villages, with the Postcode 901101:  Apugye , Barago , Baran Rafi , Barangoni , Barapa , Bazango Bwari , Bunko , Byazhi , Chikale , Dankoru , Dauda , Donabayi , Duba , Dutse Alhaji , Gaba , Galuwyi , Gidan Babachi , Gidan Baushe , Gidan Pawa , Gudupe , Gutpo , Igu , Jigo , Kaima , Karaku , Karawa , Kasaru , Katampe , Kawadashi , Kawu , Kikumi , Kimtaru , Kogo , Kubwa , Kuchibuyi , Kuduru , Kurumin Daudu , Kute , Kwabwure , Panda , Panunuki , Paspa , Payi , Piko , Rugan S/Fulani , Ruriji , Sabon Gari , Sagwari , Shere , Simape , Sumpe , T/Danzaria , T/Manu , Tokulo , Tudun Wada , Tunga Bijimi , Tunga-Adoka , Tungan Sarkin , Ushafa , Yaba , Yajida , Yaupe , Yayidna , Zango , Zuma.

History 
Its history dates as far back as the seventeenth century when a Zaria-based hunter came to the area in the company of his family to hunt. Legend has it that at the time there existed a place known as Bwayape, (Bwari Hill) which means ‘pound here’. He had given his wife some millet. She asked him where she could pound it and he said, ‘pound here’; thus the origin of the name. Bwaya later metamorphosed into the name Bwari. The four children of the hunter went swimming and were given the task of retrieving a precious object from the depth of the river. It turned out that it was the last of the four who succeeded at the task. But because of his place in the family he could not ascend the throne and his elder brother Tayebebe was crowned instead followed by Dadadogunyi. That object is still a symbol in the turbanning process of the Bwari people.

References

External links

 Official Website

Local Government Areas in the Federal Capital Territory (Nigeria)
Populated places in the Federal Capital Territory (Nigeria)